Rajat Khan (born 23 December 1996) is an Indian cricketer. He made his first-class debut for Assam in the 2017–18 Ranji Trophy on 17 November 2017.

References

External links
 

1996 births
Living people
Indian cricketers
Place of birth missing (living people)
Assam cricketers